Final standings of the 1978–79 Hungarian League season.

Final standings

Results

Statistical leaders

Top goalscorers

External links
 IFFHS link

Nemzeti Bajnokság I seasons
1978–79 in Hungarian football
Hun